Sarhang is a title and/or military rank of Iranian origin, a compound of sar ("head, chief") and hang ("an army division"). In modern usage in Iran, sarhang is the equivalent of colonel.

History

The origin of the title sarhang may date back at least to the Parthian period.
In the Sasanian period, it was a rank in the hierarchy of the aswaran cavalry force. In the medieval period, sarhang has been defined as "a heroic man, a brave fighter, a night-guard". According to Ibn al-Balkhi, the rank was immediately below spāhbadh. In Tārikh-i Bukhārā, the title is ranked below amīr. In early Islamic period, the title appears together with ayyār, and a related title, sarhang-shumārān, seems to belong to the leaders of the hierarchy of ayyārān. According to Bosworth, sarhangs were separate from ayyars, and were probably fighters with outstanding leadership or fighting qualities that were recruited from the latter.

Historical figures recorded as bearing this title include:
 Jalinus of the late Sasanian Empire
 Hasan ibn Muhammad ibn Tālūt, serving the caliph Al-Musta'in
 Wazīr ibn Ayyūb, serving the amīr of Khurasan
 Kharra Khusraw, son of Badhan (per al-Tabari)
 Bu-Ali Kutwal, a Ghaznavid officer

References

Military ranks of Iran
Sasanian military offices
Persian words and phrases